Richard Girling is a British journalist and author, known for his writing on the environment.

Life and career
Richard Girling, born in Hitchin, Hertfordshire in 1945, is a journalist for The Sunday Times. In 2002, he won the Specialist Writer category at the British Press Awards. He was awarded the Environmental Journalist of the Year award in 2008 and 2009 at Press Gazette's Environmental Journalism Awards.

Published works
Rubbish!
Sea Change
Greed: Why We Can't Help Ourselves (2009)
The Hunt for the Golden Mole (2014)
The Man Who Ate the Zoo: Frank Buckland, Forgotten Hero of Natural History (2016)

References

Living people
British writers
British journalists
Year of birth missing (living people)